The Graphic Communications Group Limited is the leading and largest newspaper publishing company in Ghana.

History
Graphic Communications Group Limited was established in 1950 by the then Daily Mirror Group in UK.

Products
Graphic publishes and distributes all the popular national newspapers. There is the Daily Graphic which is the flagship and printed everyday except on Sundays. There is the Graphic Mirror, Graphic Sports, Graphic Business, Graphic Showbiz, and the Junior Graphic for its junior readers.

References

Newspapers published in Ghana
Publishing companies of Ghana
Mass media in Accra
Companies based in Accra